Timiryazevsky (masculine), Timiryazevskaya (feminine), or Timiryazevskoye (neuter) may refer to:
Timiryazevsky District, a district of Northern Administrative Okrug, Moscow, Russia
Timiryazevsky (rural locality), a rural locality (a settlement) in Chelyabinsk Oblast, Russia
Timiryazevskoye, a rural locality (selo) in Tomsk Oblast, Russia
 Timiryazevskaya (Serpukhovsko-Timiryazevskaya line), a station of the Moscow Metro, Moscow, Russia
Timiryazevskaya (Monorail), a station of the Moscow Monorail Transit System
Timiryazevskaya railway station, a station of D1 line in Moscow, Russia

See also
Timiryazev (disambiguation)
Serpukhovsko-Timiryazevskaya Line